South Africa–Turkey relations are the current and historical relations between the Republic of South Africa and the Republic of Turkey. Formal diplomatic relations were established at consular level in 1991 and consulates-general were opened in Istanbul and Johannesburg respectively. Both consulates were closed following the upgrading of relations to ambassadorial level in October 1992. South Africa has an embassy in Ankara. Turkey has an embassy in Pretoria. From 1998, Turkey has maintained a Consulate General in Cape Town with jurisdiction over the Western, Northern and Eastern Cape Provinces. The post is filled by the current incumbent in an honorary capacity, Adv Glenn Babb.

Historical relations
The forerunner to Turkey, the Ottoman Empire, established relations with colonial South Africa, which was then part of the British Empire, in 1861 with the appointment of a Mr. de Roubaix to Istanbul. Mr. Bettelheim was sent from the Ottoman Empire to Cape Town in 1889. Bettelheim remained in the post of consul to South Africa until 1896. The Ottomans also maintained consulates in Durban and Johannesburg. Relations between the Ottoman Empire and South Africa were maintained until the outbreak of World War I, when the Ottomans entered the war on the side of the German Empire, whereas the Union of South Africa entered alongside the British. Prior to the outbreak of the Great War, a new consular arrived in Cape Town, Mehmet Remzi Bey. He was interned during the war by the British authorities and died in 1916. He was buried in Johannesburg.

Religious relations
In 1863, a qadi, or Islamic judge, was sent by the Ottoman Sultan Abdulaziz to teach the Muslim population in Cape Town. The judge was Abu Bakr Effendi and he was credited with introducing the fez for men, as well as reinstating the hijab for women. More importantly, besides his role as teacher he also published the Arabic Afrikaans "Uiteensetting van die godsdiens" ("Bayan ad-Din", or "The Exposition of the Religion") in 1877. He married a British woman and died in South Africa in 1880.

Turkey and the apartheid government
Turkey stood in consistent opposition to the white minority governments in South Africa. It did not maintain any type of relations until negotiations began between the African National Congress and the government towards democratic elections. Turkey also promoted the independence of Namibia, which was under the occupation of South Africa from World War I until  October 1990.

Post-apartheid relations

South Africa and Turkey normalized relations following the democratic elections of 1994 in South Africa. The government of South Africa maintained a similar position on Kurdish nationalism as the Turkish Republic.

See also 
 Foreign relations of South Africa
 Foreign relations of Turkey
 Turks in South Africa

Notes

Sources

External links 
 South African embassy in Ankara
 Turkish Ministry of Foreign Affairs about relations with South Africa

 
Turkey
Bilateral relations of Turkey